El Djem or El Jem (Tunisian Arabic:) is a town in Mahdia Governorate, Tunisia. Its population was 21,576 during the 2014 census. It is home to Roman remains including the "Amphitheater of El Jem".

History

The Roman city of Thysdrus was built, like almost all Roman settlements in ancient Tunisia, on former Punic settlements. In a less arid climate than today's, Thysdrus prospered as an important center of olive oil production and export. It was the seat of a Christian bishopric, which is included in the Catholic Church's list of titular sees.

By the early 3rd century, when the amphitheater was built, Thysdrus rivaled Hadrumetum (modern Sousse) as the second city of Roman North Africa after Carthage. However, following the abortive revolt that began there in AD238 and Gordian's suicide in his villa near Carthage, Roman troops loyal to the emperor Maximinus Thrax sacked the city. The town is shown on the 4th-century Peutinger Map.

Sights

Amphitheater

The Amphitheatre of El Jem could seat 35,000 spectators. Only the Colosseum in Rome (seating about 50,000 spectators) and the ruined theater of Capua were larger.

The amphitheater at El Djem was built by the Romans under proconsul Gordian, who was acclaimed emperor at Thysdrus around 238 and was mainly used for gladiator shows and small-scale chariot races.

Until the 17th century, it remained more or less whole. From then on its stones were used for building the nearby village of El Djem and transported to the Great Mosque in Kairouan. At a tense moment during struggles with the Ottomans, the Turks used cannons to flush rebels out of the amphitheater.

The ruins of the amphitheater were declared a World Heritage Site in 1979. It hosts the annual El Djem International Symphony Festival.

Others
Drifting sand is preserving the market city of Thysdrus and the refined suburban villas that once surrounded it. Some floor mosaics have been found and published, one of them featuring the iconography of (Dea) Africa, but field archaeology has scarcely been attempted. Recently with aerial photos, a huge racetrack stadium has been discovered.

The dry climate of Thysdrus has helped to preserve writings on papyrus.

World War II
During World War II a major military airfield was located near El Djem, used first by the German Luftwaffe.  It was attacked on numerous occasions and later used by the United States Army Air Forces Twelfth Air Force as a transport field.  There are few, if any, remains of the airfield today with the land being returned to agricultural uses outside of the city.

Transport
El Djem is located on the A1 motorway which runs from Tunis to Sfax.

The metre gauge railway from Tunis to Gabès, known as La Ligne de la Côte, stops at El Djem.

Gallery

See also
 Hadrumetum
 Thapsus
 Dougga
 Roman 'Coloniae' in Berber Africa

References

External links
 Ancient Places TV: HD Video of El Djem amphitheatre
 Roman mosaics in Tunisia
 Romanheritage.com site with photos of El Djem amphitheater in Tunisia

 
Communes of Tunisia
Populated places in Mahdia Governorate
Roman sites in Tunisia
Thysdrus